Gooday is a surname. Notable people with the surname include:

Graeme John Norman Gooday (born 1965), British historian and philosopher of science
Graham Gooday (1942–2001), British molecular biologist
Leslie Gooday (1921–2013), British architect
Sydney Gooday (1887–1964), British and Canadian swimmer